James Gaye Stewart (June 28, 1923 – November 18, 2010) was a professional ice hockey forward. He played nine seasons as a left winger in the National Hockey League.

Playing career
Born in Fort William, Ontario, Stewart was called from the minors in 1942 to play in one game of the Stanley Cup Finals, where he helped the Toronto Maple Leafs win the Stanley Cup. The next season, Stewart won the 1942–43 Calder Memorial Trophy, beating out Maurice 'The Rocket' Richard of the Montreal Canadiens. He became the first player to win the Stanley Cup before the Calder. Danny Grant, Tony Esposito and Ken Dryden have accomplished the feat since then.

After spending two years in the Royal Canadian Navy during World War II, Stewart returned to the NHL in 1945 and had his best season, leading the league with 37 goals - the last time a Leaf led the League in goals before Auston Matthews in 2020–21. Stewart won his second Stanley Cup, again with the Maple Leafs, in 1946–47. Toronto traded Stewart to Chicago early in the 1947–48 season in a deal that brought Max Bentley to the Leafs. Stewart had three 20-goal seasons for the Black Hawks before finishing his career with stints with the Detroit Red Wings, New York Rangers and Montreal Canadiens. In all, Gaye Stewart played for five of the NHL's Original Six teams, all except the Boston Bruins. He played 502 career NHL games, scoring 185 goals and 159 assists for 344 points. Stewart died on November 18, 2010, in a hospital in Burlington, Ontario, at the age of 87.

Awards and achievements
Stanley Cup champion in 1942 and 1947.
Calder Memorial Trophy winner in 1943.
Selected to the NHL First All-Star Team in 1946.
Selected to the NHL Second All-Star Team in 1948.
Played in 1947, 1948, 1950 and 1951 NHL All-Star Games.
Selected to the AHL First All-Star Team in 1954.
Former last member of the Toronto Maple Leafs to lead the NHL in goals with 37 in 1946.

Career statistics

References

External links

Gaye Stewart Interview
Gaye Stewart's Day with the Stanley Cup

1923 births
2010 deaths
Calder Trophy winners
Canadian ice hockey right wingers
Canadian military personnel of World War II
Chicago Blackhawks captains
Chicago Blackhawks players
Detroit Red Wings players
Ice hockey people from Ontario
Sportspeople from Thunder Bay
Montreal Canadiens players
New York Rangers players
Stanley Cup champions
Toronto Maple Leafs players
Toronto Marlboros players